The 1990–91  Liga Leumit season began on October 1990 and ended on June 1991, with Maccabi Haifa winning the title.

The regular season had each team play twice against each opponent. The table was then divided into two, with top six teams entering the championship play-off and bottom six in the relegation play-off, where each team played the other teams in the play-off twice.

Two teams from Liga Artzit were promoted at the end of the previous season: Tzafririm Holon and Hapoel Tel Aviv. The two teams relegated were Shimshon Tel Aviv and Hapoel Ramat Gan.

Regular season

Table

Results

Playoffs

Top playoff

Table

Results

Bottom playoff

Table

Results

Top scorers
 Nir Levine (Hapoel Petah Tikva) - 20
 Reuven Atar (Maccabi Haifa) - 15
 Yigal Menahem (Maccabi Haifa) - 13

Liga Leumit seasons
Israel
1